A bedtime story is a popular form of storytelling.

Bedtime story or Bedtime stories may also refer to:

Film
 Bedtime Story (1938 film), a British drama film directed by Donovan Pedelty
 Bedtime Story (1941 film), a 1941 comedy film
 Bedtime Story (1964 film), a 1964 comedy film, with a different plot than the 1941 film
 Bedtime Stories (film), a 2008 family fantasy comedy starring Adam Sandler

Television
 Bedtime Stories (1974 TV series), an BBC2 anthology series
 "Bedtime Stories" (How I Met Your Mother), an episode of the television series How I Met Your Mother
 "Bedtime Stories" (Supernatural), an episode of the television series Supernatural
 "Bedtime Story" (Charlie Jade), an episode of the television series Charlie Jade
 "Bedtime Story" (Golden Girls episode), an episode of the television series Golden Girls
 Tim & Eric's Bedtime Stories, a TV anthology series

Music
 Bedtime Stories (David Baerwald album), 1990
 Bedtime Stories (Madonna album), 1994
 "Bedtime Story" (Madonna song), a 1994 song from the above album
 Bedtime Story (album), a 1972 album by Tammy Wynette
 "Bedtime Story" (Tammy Wynette song), 1972
 "Bedtime Story" (Warm Guns song), 1983
 Bedtime Stories, a 1975 album by Judge Dread

Other
 Bedtime Stories, a series of children's storybooks by Arthur S. Maxwell
 "Bedtime Stories", a newspaper column by American author Thornton W. Burgess

See also 
A Bedtime Story, a 1933 comedy film